The FIL European Luge Championships 1934 took place in Ilmenau, Germany under the auspices of the Internationaler Schlittensportsverband (ISSV - International Sled Sports Federation in ), a forerunner to the International Luge Federation.

Men's singles

Women's singles

Men's doubles

Medal table

References
Men's doubles European champions
Men's singles European champions
Women's singles European champions

FIL European Luge Championships
Ilmenau
1934 in luge
Luge in Germany
1934 in German sport